Pinsley Mill, also known as Etnam Street Mill, is a former watermill in Leominster, Herefordshire, England.

It was one of Leominster's first mills, situated where the Pinsley Brook left the monastic precinct around Leominster Priory, and was mentioned in a lease of 1675 as a "watercorne" mill.

At some time between 1744 and 1748 it was reopened by Daniel Bourn as a cotton mill, one of the Paul-Wyatt cotton mills built to house the roller spinning machinery invented by Lewis Paul and John Wyatt, that first enabled the spinning of cotton "without the aid of human fingers". Bourn's mill operated successfully as a mill until 1754, when it was destroyed by fire.

The mill was rebuilt and returned to its original function as a corn mill, remaining in use until the Second World War.

The mill was vandalised and set alight several times in 2010 – 2013.  It was demolished in 2014.

References

Bibliography

Textile mills in Herefordshire
Cotton mills
Former textile mills in the United Kingdom
Buildings and structures in Leominster
Watermills in Herefordshire
Industrial Revolution in England
Spinning
Textile mills completed in the 18th century
Demolished buildings and structures in England
Demolished manufacturing buildings and structures
Buildings and structures demolished in 2014
2014 disestablishments in England